John David James Dalrymple, 14th Earl of Stair (born 4 September 1961) is a British politician who, since 2008, has been a crossbench member of the House of Lords.

Background
Stair is the eldest child of John Dalrymple, 13th Earl of Stair and Davina Katherine Bowes-Lyon (2 May 1930 - 1 November 2017), daughter of David Bowes-Lyon, brother of Queen Elizabeth The Queen Mother. Lord Stair's mother, Davina, therefore, was a first cousin of Queen Elizabeth II and he is a second cousin of The King, The Princess Royal, The Duke of York, and The Earl of Wessex. Through his mother, he is descended from the Bowes-Lyon, Astor, and Cavendish-Bentinck families. Educated at Harrow School & RMA Sandhurst, he served with 2nd Battalion Scots Guards in the Falklands War.

Political career
On inheriting his peerage in 1996, Lord Stair entered the House of Lords and sat as a crossbencher—that is, an independent. In 1999, the House of Lords Act removed the rights of all hereditary peers to sit in the House; however, ninety-two peers were permitted to remain in the House, elected by other peers. He failed to be elected at that time. Following the death of Davina Ingrams, 18th Baroness Darcy de Knayth in 2008, Lord Stair was elected to the Lords. On 13 October 2011, he made a speech in the Aviation Debate.

Family
Lord Stair married Emily Mary Julia Stonor, daughter of Ralph Stonor, 7th Baron Camoys and Elizabeth Mary Hyde Parker, in 2006.

They have two children:
John James Thomas Dalrymple, Viscount Dalrymple (born 3 January 2008) 
Lady Elizabeth Alice Mary Lily Dalrymple (born 24 July 2012)

Arms

References

External links

1961 births
Living people
People educated at Harrow School
Graduates of the Royal Military Academy Sandhurst
Astor family
English people of American descent
Earls of Stair
Place of birth missing (living people)
Crossbench hereditary peers
Stair
Stair